Sartekeh-ye Olya (also Romanized as Sārtekeh-ye ‘Olyā; also known as Sārdekeh-ye Bālā) is a village in Kani Sur Rural District, Namshir District, Baneh County, Kurdistan Province, Iran. At the 2016 census, its population was around 200. The village is populated by Kurds.

References 

Towns and villages in Baneh County
Kurdish settlements in Kurdistan Province